Pantelis Voulgaris (born 23 October 1940) is a Greek film director and screenwriter. His first feature film To proxenio tis Annas in 1972 won the first prize in Thessaloniki International Film Festival. His 1989 film The Striker with Number 9 was entered into the 39th Berlin International Film Festival. Two years later, his film Quiet Days in August was entered into the 41st Berlin International Film Festival. In 2005 his film Brides was entered into the 27th Moscow International Film Festival.

Selected filmography
 To proxenio tis Annas (1972)
 Happy Day (1977)
 Eleftherios Venizelos (1980)
 Petrina Chronia (Stone Years) (1985)
 The Striker with Number 9 (1989)
 Quiet Days in August (1991)
 Akropol (1995)
 It's a Long Road (1998)
 Nyfes (2004)
 Psyche Vathia (Deep Soul) (2009)
 Little England (Little England) (2013)
 To Teleftaio Simeioma (The Last Note) (2017)

References

External links

1940 births
Living people
Greek film directors
Greek screenwriters
Film people from Athens